The 1876 New Shoreham by-election was fought on 4 August 1876.  The byelection was fought due to the death of the incumbent Conservative MP, Percy Burrell.  It was won by the Conservative candidate Walter Burrell.

References

1876 elections in the United Kingdom
1876 in England
19th century in Sussex
By-elections to the Parliament of the United Kingdom in Sussex constituencies
Shoreham-by-Sea